This is a list of production cars with carbon-fiber monocoque cell design.

Carbon-fiber monocoque design is commonly used in racing cars since 1980's, like Formula racing and Le Mans series prototypes. The first production car with carbon-fiber monocoque design was the Jaguar XJR-15. Now many modern sports cars have carbon-fiber monocoque cells, and some big car manufacturers have also started applying the same in passenger cars like the BMW i3.

Eligible cars
For the purposes of this list, a production car is defined as a vehicle that is:

 Has to have a carbon-fiber monocoque/tub.
 constructed principally for retail sale to consumers, for their personal use, to transport people on public roads (no commercial or industrial vehicles are eligible)
 available for commercial sale to the public
 manufactured by a manufacturer whose WMI number is shown on the VIN, including vehicles that are modified by either professional tuners or others that result in a VIN with a WMI number in their name (for example, if a Porsche-based car is remanufactured by RUF and has RUF's WMI W09, it is eligible; but if it has Porsche's WMI, WP0, it is not eligible)
 street-legal in its intended markets, having fulfilled the homologation tests or inspections required under either a) United States of America, b) European Union law, or (c) Japan) to be granted this status
 sold in more than one national market.

List

References

carbon fiber monocoque cars